The Perseus Arm is one of two major spiral arms of the Milky Way galaxy. The second major arm is called the Scutum–Centaurus Arm. The Perseus Arm begins from the distal end of the long Milky Way central bar. Previously thought to be 13,000 light-years away, it is now thought to lie 6,400 light years from the Solar System.

Overview
The Milky Way is a barred spiral galaxy with two major arms and a number of minor arms or spurs. The Perseus Spiral Arm, with a radius of approximately 10.7 kiloparsecs, is located between the minor Cygnus and Carina–Sagittarius Arms. It is named after the Perseus constellation in the direction of which it is seen from Earth.

Recently, scientists in two large radio astronomy projects, the Bar and Spiral Structure Legacy (BeSSeL) Survey and the Japanese VLBI Exploration of Radio Astrometry (VERA), have made great efforts about 20 years to measure the trigonometric parallaxes toward about 200 water vapor and methanol masers in massive star-forming regions in the Milky Way. They have employed these parallax measurements to delineate the forms of spiral arms from the Galactic longitude 2 to 240 degrees and extended the spiral arm traces into the portion of the Milky Way seen from the Southern Hemisphere using tangencies along some arms based on carbon monoxide emission. The image clearly presents the Milky Way as a barred spiral galaxy with fairly symmetric four major arms and some extra arm segments and spurs.

The Perseus Arm is one of the four major arms. The arm is the length of more than 60,000 lr and the width of about 1,000 lr and the spiral extension in the pitch angle near 9 degree.

There is speculation that the local spur known as the Orion–Cygnus Arm, which includes the Solar System and Earth and is located inside of the Perseus Arm, is a branch of it, but this is unconfirmed.

The Perseus Arm contains the Double Cluster and a number of Messier objects:
The Crab Nebula (M1)
Open Cluster M36
Open Cluster M37
Open Cluster M38
Open Cluster M52
Open Cluster M103.

See also
 Galactic disc
 List of Messier objects

References

External links 
Messier Objects in the Milky Way Galaxy (SEDS)

 
Milky Way arms
Galactic astronomy
Spiral galaxies